Lyudmyla Yuriïvna Lusnikova (born January 7, 1982, in Zaporizhia) is a Ukrainian judoka, who played for the extra-lightweight category (48 kg). At age eighteen, Lusnikova made her official debut at the 2000 Summer Olympics in Sydney, where she reached into the semi-final rounds, losing out to Japan's Ryoko Tani. She qualified for the repechage bout, after finding out that her previous opponent made further into the final round. In the second round of repechage bouts, Lusnikova was defeated by China's Zhao Shunxin, who scored a yuko to win a match at the closing time of four minutes.

Eight years after competing in her first Olympics, Lusnikova qualified for the second time in the women's 48 kg class at the 2008 Summer Olympics in Beijing. She defeated Tunisia's Chahnez M'barki in the first preliminary round, before losing out her next match, by a waza-ari (half-point) and a seoi nage (shoulder throw), to South Korea's Kim Young-Ran.

References

External links

NBC Olympics Profile

Living people
1982 births
Ukrainian female judoka
Olympic judoka of Ukraine
Judoka at the 2000 Summer Olympics
Judoka at the 2008 Summer Olympics
Sportspeople from Zaporizhzhia
21st-century Ukrainian women